Phalacropterix is a genus of moths belonging to the family Psychidae.

The species of this genus are found in Europe.

Species:
 Phalacropterix apiformis (Rossi, 1790) 
 Phalacropterix bruandi Lederer, 1855

References

Psychidae
Psychidae genera